Cumberland City Hall is a historic city hall in Cumberland, Allegany County, Maryland, United States. It was built between 1911 and 1912 and replaced the Cumberland, Maryland City Hall & Academy of Music.  It is a 7-by-7-bay, two-story, stone-faced, neo-classical structure.  It features an irregular corner, into which the architect has recessed a curving bay; the upper window in this curving bay has been filled with glass block. A mural by artist Gertrude du Brau on the interior of the rotunda dome depicts the early history of the city, including representations of General Edward Braddock and of George Washington.

The Cumberland City Hall was listed on the National Register of Historic Places in 1973.

References

External links
, including photo from 1923, at Maryland Historical Trust

City and town halls in Maryland
Buildings and structures in Cumberland, Maryland
City and town halls on the National Register of Historic Places in Maryland
Government buildings completed in 1912
1912 establishments in Maryland
National Register of Historic Places in Allegany County, Maryland